Belence can refer to:

 Belence, Çivril
 the Hungarian name for Belinț in Romania